The Hole Idea is a 1955 Warner Bros. Looney Tunes cartoon directed and animated by Robert McKimson with character layout and background layout and paint by Richard H. Thomas. McKimson was the sole animator on the short, as this was during the time he was re-assembling his unit after the brief 1953 shutdown of Warner Bros. Animation. The short was released on April 16, 1955.

Plot
A scientist, Professor Calvin Q. Calculus, successfully creates a portable hole invention, despite disapproval from his nagging wife.  His creation is celebrated in a newsreel, showcasing the various uses for a portable hole:  Rescuing a baby from a safe, cheating at your golf game and giving dogs a new place to bury their bones. Spurred by the film, a thief steals a briefcase containing Calvin's portable holes and uses them for criminal purposes, including emptying Fort Knox and abducting a dancing girl from a burlesque house. However, he is chased by the police until he is backed against a wall, when he uses the last portable hole in the briefcase to go through the wall and seemingly escape, it is revealed that the other side is inside a prison. Calvin reads about the arrest in the paper and is glad, but Calvin's domineering wife berates him furiously for not treating her right and says that one of them must leave. In retaliation, Calvin creates one more portable hole and throws it on the floor.  The wife steps in it and falls through it. After a few seconds, Satan comes up the portable hole, throws her back to Earth and replies: "Isn't it bad enough down there without her?" as the cartoon ends.

See also
List of American films of 1955

References

External links

1955 films
1955 animated films
1955 short films
1950s science fiction films
American science fiction comedy films
Films directed by Robert McKimson
Films set in Kentucky
The Devil in film
Looney Tunes shorts
Warner Bros. Cartoons animated short films
1950s Warner Bros. animated short films
Films scored by Milt Franklyn
1950s English-language films
Films about scientists